Juan Martín Fernández Lobbe (born 19 November 1981 in Buenos Aires) is an Argentine rugby union footballer. He currently plays for Toulon in the French Top 14, having moved from Sale Sharks in England's Guinness Premiership. He previously played for Liceo Naval. He usually plays in the back row.

He made his debut for the Sale Sharks in 2006 against the Leicester Tigers. His debut season for the Sharks was the 2006–07 Guinness Premiership. He was Sale's first XV captain. He made his international debut for Argentina in 2004 against Uruguay. He was a part of the Pumas team that defeated Wales at home in a two Test series, scoring a try in one game.

Fernández Lobbe featured in the side that defeated England at Twickenham in November 2006 as well as back to back victories over Ireland the following year. And he was an integral part of the Los Pumas team in their 2007 Rugby World Cup campaign which succeeded in gaining Argentina's highest World Cup finish of third place. He played in every game en route to the semi-final which they lost to the eventual champions South Africa.
He led his country for the first time in November 2008, a game which they lost at the hands of Ireland. However Fernández Lobbe retained the captaincy in the absence of Felipe Contepomi and defeated England in front of their home crowd in 2009.

He was part of the Argentine squad at the 2011 Rugby World Cup in New Zealand and 2015 Rugby World Cup in England.

He was the captain of the Pumas, a position he took over after succeeding Felipe Contepomi. As captain, he played every game of 2012 Rugby Championship and four during the 2013 Rugby Championship. He also played in  the 2014 and 2015 Rugby Championships.

Fernández Lobbe won the French Top 14 in 2014 and the Heineken Cup in 2013, 2014 and 2015 with Toulon. He's now considered as one of the best Toulon players ever.

Honours

Toulon
 Top 14 Winner: 2013-2014
 Heineken Cup/European Rugby Champions Cup Winner: 2012–13, 2013–14, 2014–15

Argentina
 Rugby World Cup bronze medalist: 2007

References

External links 
 Juan Martín Fernández Lobbe at UAR.com.ar
 Juan Martín Fernández Lobbe on salesharks.com
 Profile at Toulon RC

Argentine rugby union players
1981 births
Living people
Rugby union players from Buenos Aires
Sale Sharks players
Rugby union flankers
Rugby union number eights
RC Toulonnais players
Expatriate rugby union players in France
Argentine expatriate sportspeople in France
Argentine expatriate sportspeople in England
Argentina international rugby union players
Argentine expatriate rugby union players
Expatriate rugby union players in England
Argentina international rugby sevens players
Barbarian F.C. players